Desbarats is a surname. Notable people with the surname include:

 George-Paschal Desbarats (1808–1864), Canadian printer, publisher, businessman, and landowner
 George-Édouard Desbarats (1838–1893), Canadian printer and inventor
 Michelle Desbarats, Canadian poet
 Peter Desbarats (1933–2014), Canadian writer, playwright and journalist

Locations
Desbarats, Ontario, a community in Canada
Desbarats Strait, in the Arctic Archipelago in Canada
Desbarats River, a tributary of the Etchemin River in Canada